Benjamin Sampair Tracy is an American journalist known for his work as a national correspondent for CBS News since January 2008. He is the White House correspondent for the CBS Evening News with Norah O'Donnell and CBS This Morning.

Career
Tracy was a reporter for WCCO-TV, the CBS-affiliate station in Minneapolis, where he was a member of the station's investigative team, covering many major stories, including the methamphetamine epidemic and the collapse of the 35W bridge.

During that time, he also was a contributor to the Saturday Early Show, to which he brought his signature "Good Question" segment, started at WCCO-TV, to a national audience. Tracy also reported for the CBS Evening News with Katie Couric on the collapse of the I-35W bridge and flooding in southern Minnesota.

Before joining WCCO-TV, Tracy worked as a reporter at WISN-TV Milwaukee and WBAY-TV Green Bay, Wisconsin. He is the recipient of five Emmy Awards and the Alfred DuPont-Columbia award for excellence in broadcast journalism.

Tracy was born in St. Paul, Minnesota. He graduated from St. Thomas Academy and later from Marquette University with bachelor's degrees in broadcast journalism and political science and with a master's degree in public service. Tracy lives in Washington, D.C.

Controversy
On October 5, 2020, Tracy criticized the lack of adherence he observed at the Trump White House to public health guidelines to slow the spread of the COVID-19 pandemic "I felt safer reporting in North Korea than I currently do reporting at The White House. This is just crazy. For context folks, this is in reference to the COVID-19 outbreak at The White House." The tweet garnered nearly 195,000 "Likes", as well as swift criticism from Republicans.

References

External links

 

Living people
Marquette University alumni
American television reporters and correspondents
People from Saint Paul, Minnesota
1976 births
CBS News people
American LGBT broadcasters